Amata phaeochyta is a species of moth of the family Erebidae first described by Alfred Jefferis Turner in 1907. It is found in Australia.

References 

phaeochyta
Moths described in 1907
Moths of Australia